The  was a Japanese sniper rifle used during the Second World War. It was a sniper version of the Type 99 rifle, chambered in the 7.7×58mm round. There were a few variations of the Type 99 sniper rifle, some with the straight bolt and the scope mounted on the left side of the receiver which allowed use of stripper clips. Another variation was one with a bent bolt and the scope above the receiver which required the sniper to load the rounds one at a time. The shorter barrel, combined with the larger caliber round made concealment more difficult than the Type 97 rifle that preceded it, considering the louder muzzle blast and flash caused by the increased powder capacity.

References

Sniper rifles of Japan
World War II infantry weapons of Japan
Bolt-action rifles of Japan